William Edward Johnson (born December 9, 1968) is a retired American professional football defensive lineman who played eight years in the NFL for four teams.  He played college football at Michigan State University.

References

1968 births
Living people
American football defensive tackles
American football defensive ends
Michigan State Spartans football players
Cleveland Browns players
Pittsburgh Steelers players
St. Louis Rams players
Philadelphia Eagles players
Players of American football from Chicago